The Instituto de Enseñanza Secundaria San Isidro (IES San Isidro) is a co-educational day school for pupils from 12 to 18 years of age. It is located in the historical Calle de Toledo in Madrid, Spain.

It is one of 66 secondary schools established in provincial capitals and other major cities under the 1836 Plan General de Instrucción Pública. Most of these schools occupied the premises of disentailed convents and other church buildings. Originally a boys' school, it became coeducational and state-owned in the second half of the 20th century. The school occupies part of a site belonging to several earlier schools, indirectly tracing its origins to 1346, and is considered the oldest non-university education center in Spain.

San Isidro has educated eight Spanish prime ministers and was formerly referred to as the "nanny" of Spain's statesmen. With the discovery of the Americas, the school gained importance in educating young men who would later become a credit to the Spanish Empire. It has four Nobel Prize laureates among its alumni: José Echegaray, Jacinto Benavente, Vicente Aleixandre, and Camilo José Cela.

Heritage

The school occupies part of the site
originally belonging to several former education centers, including 
the Reales Estudios de San Isidro (1625–1809), formally known as the Colegio Imperial (–1625). 
It was built on land donated by Empress Maria of Austria.

The current building includes the baroque cloister (1672), a baroque staircase and an elegant chapel (1723). On the stairs is a small museum dedicated to science and education.

From 1847 to 1936, Madrid's School of Architecture (Escuela Especial de Arquitectura, now Superior Technical School of Architecture of Madrid, ETSAM) occupied part of the premises of the Institute, together with the secondary school and other schools and departments. In 1936, it moved to its current site at Ciudad Universitaria. The School of Architecture's coat of arms remain over the main entrance to the Institute.

The school has a museum on the ground floor with a recreation of a school class and four floors of various interests.

Notable alumni

The former pupils of San Isidro are known as "Old Franciscans".
The school has educated a wide range of notable figures including four Nobel Prize laureates and eight Spanish prime ministers.
Many old pupils went on to fight in the Spanish Civil War, the great majority of them joining the Nationalist side, with around 200 being killed during the two-year conflict. In addition, 12 Old Franciscans from the Blue Division died fighting in the Eastern Front during World War II.

See also
 List of the oldest schools in the world
 Colegiata de San Isidro
 Colegio Imperial de Madrid
 List of Jesuit sites

References

Bibliography

"La conformación del Colegio Imperial de Madrid (1560-1767)." Anales del Instituto de Estudios Madrileños, LIII, pp. 135–175. Madrid, 2013
, Vicente, El Instituto San Isidro: Saber y Patrimonio, Apuntes para una Historia (Madrid, Editorial CSIC, 2013)
, José Simón, Historia del Colegio Imperial de Madrid: Volúmenes I y II (Madrid, Instituto de Estudios Madrileños, 1959)

External links 

 
 Madrid Oculto – Short documentary of San Isidro

Schools in Spain
Secondary schools in the Community of Madrid
Schools in Madrid
Educational institutions established in the 14th century